The Liguang Xinxiu Cup, or Ricoh Xinxiu Cup, is a  Go competition in China.

Outline
The tournament is sponsored by Ricoh of Hong Kong and is the youth version of the Ricoh Cup.

Past Winners and Runners-up

References

Go competitions in China
Recurring sporting events established in 2007